Jerome S. Roberts (April 28, 1940 – August 17, 2017) was an American football player and coach. He served as the head football coach at Saint Francis University in Loretto, Pennsylvania for one season, in 1980, compiling a record of 2–7. Roberts played college football at Lock Haven University of Pennsylvania from 1959 to 1962.

Head coaching record

References

External links
 

1940 births
2017 deaths
Lock Haven Bald Eagles football players
Saint Francis Red Flash football coaches
High school football coaches in Pennsylvania